Sarnowa is a Polish place name of:
 Sarnowa, Rawicz, a historic once independent town, now a neighbourhood in Rawicz
 Sarnowa, Konin County, a village in the administrative district of Gmina Ślesin, Konin County
 Sarnowa-Kolonia, a village in the administrative district of Gmina Ślesin
 Sarnowa Góra, a village in the administrative district of Gmina Sońsk, Ciechanów County

See also
 Sarnówka (disambiguation)